Myanmar and Thailand men's national football teams are sporting rivals and had played with each other over 50 matches. In overall result, Thailand had defeated Myanmar 21 times, comparing to 15 victories of the Burmese over the Thais. It is one of Southeast Asia and Asia's rivalries, and used to be one of Asia's greatest rivalries until the fall of Burma team from late 1980s onward. Despite this, matches between Myanmar and Thailand are still widely followed by fans of two countries.

Historical reasons for the rivalry
Myanmar and Thailand have a long and complicated history. Two countries are both dominant Theravada countries, and enjoying a long Buddhist connection of two nations. However, since 16th century, series of wars occurred between two nations, which Burma managed to conquer Siam (old name of Thailand) twice while the Siamese under Naresuan conquered Burma once. However, the most catastrophic and tragic part of Thai history came after the 1765–67 war, which the Burmese brutally burnt and destroyed Ayutthaya to ruins and stole Siamese greatest goods to Burma. As for the result, a deep enmity and strong anti-Burmese sentiment developed in Thailand for decades.

During 1950s to 1970s, Burma was one of Asia's best football countries, produced many popular stars while Thailand had not yet consolidated its power. Since 1980s, Thailand started to rise while Burma fell, and the tide turned from the Burmese to the Thais. Today, the rivalry between Myanmar and Thailand has been less important due to rapid rise of Indonesia, Singapore, Malaysia and Vietnam; but it remains highly noticed. Myanmar, since 1983, has yet to defeat Thailand again.

Matches

References

Myanmar national football team
Thailand national football team
Myanmar–Thailand relations
1957 establishments in Asia
International association football rivalries